Lithium mining in Australia is highlighted by the Greenbushes hard-rock lithium mine in Western Australia, labelled by the Sydney Morning Herald, "the world's largest hard-rock lithium mine". Lithium is a soft metal with a silvery-white appearance. It is recovered from mineral deposits, mostly from spodumene and large lithium rich brines in salt lakes. According to Statista, as of 2018, Australia has surpassed Chile to become the largest producer of lithium by metric tonnes. Australia is home to lithium miners, Orocobre, Core Lithium, Galaxy Resources, Pilbara Minerals, Mineral Resources and Altura Mining with most of the large lithium miners producing lithium from hard-rock spodumene in Western Australia.

Initial development 
Talison is a leading producer of lithium and one of the first mining companies to begin development in Australia, from its prized Greenbushes Lithium Operations, "Greenbushes was Australia’s first hard rock lithium mine", with its first lithium plant being commissioned in 1985. Galaxy resources founded in 1996, commenced production of spodumene out of its Mt Cattlin mine, north of Ravensthorpe in Western Australia, in November 2010.  

Mineral Resources was established in 1992 and listed on the Australian Securities Exchange in 2006.

Current situation 

On 16 March 2016, Platypus Minerals and Lepidico executed a binding term sheet for the acquisition by Platypus of 100 percent of Lepidico. Lepidico is a company with lithium exploration assets and proprietary metallurgical processing technology.

From a policy perspective, the Australian Government is encouraging investment in the lithium industry. As of 10 April 2019, The Federal Government and the State Government along with industry have agreed to fund a new modern national lithium research centre valued at $135 million which "will operate out of Curtin University in Perth", for $53 million. The facility aims to make Western Australia a hub for battery-making and research surrounding lithium battery manufacturing.

Orocobre is a lithium chemicals supplier headquartered out of Brisbane, Australia. Its key lithium assets include the Olaroz Lithium facility, Cauchari Lithium Project and its processing facilities of Borax Argentina S.A. It also has a 33.5 percent stake in Advantage Lithium. The company's lithium assets at Olaroz are owned by Sales de Jujuy, an Argentine company, which Orocobre has a 66.5 percent stake. The remaining partners on the project are Toyota Tsusho Corporation, who owns 22.5 percent and Jujuy Energia, 8.5 percent. In 2018, Orocobre raised A$361 million of capital "to fund the expansion of the Olaroz Lithium Project Stage 2 and construction of a lithium hydroxide plant in Japan". According to Orocobre, "the lithium market experienced strong demand during FY18 encouraged by upward revisions to key forward indicators including EV plans of car manufacturers, further battery capacity expansions and growing investment supporting EV uptake and ESS development". Orocobre expects lithium demand to reach 800ktpa of lithium carbonate by 2025.

As of the first quarter 2018, Galaxy Resources classification on the Australian Securities Exchange is as a mining producing entity. The company has three main projects. Sal de Vida project is Galaxy's lithium brine project located in north-west Argentina, recognised globally "as one of the world's largest and highest quality, undeveloped brine deposits", is currently in development phase, with specialists in engineering, permitting and government attempting to establish the most economic process route. Mt Cattlin is the company's spodumene project and James Bay is its lithium pegmatite project located in Quebec, Canada.

Pilbara Minerals produces out of its Pilgangoora Lithium-Tantalum project located in Western Australia's Pilbara region. The site is located 120 km from Port Hedland. By 2018, the company had "attracted a group of high quality, experience global offtake partners including Gangfeng Lithium, General Lithium, Great Wall Motor Company and POSCO" as potential customers of its Pilgangoora project and was exploring options to scale the project.

Mineral Resources "is an Australian based mining service, contracting, processing and commodities production company". Its Wodgina lithium project has commenced sales of spodumene concentrate and Mt Marion has continued sales of spodumene concentrate to Ganfeng "pursuant to offtake arrangement". 

Altura Mining operates the Altura Lithium Mine at Pilgangoora in the Pilbara region of Western Australia. The mine produces 220ktpa of spodumene concentrate, commencing production in 2018. It completed a definitive feasibility study on a stage 2 expansion to 440ktpa in 2019. As of December 2020, the company planned to decide on whether to pursue the second phase of the project following a review of stage 1.

Finniss Lithium Project is being developed by Core Lithium having completed definitive feasibility study (DFS) in April 2019 with revisions in 2020 and 2021. The project will unfold in stages, initially with open-pit mining near Grants and Hang Gong, as well as underground mining at the Grants, BP33, and Carlton prospects. Estimated at 3.45 million tonnes (Mt) of mineral resource of 1.4 percent lithium oxide.  Major Project Status (MPS) was granted by the Australian government in March 2021, and battery-grade lithium hydroxide was produced as part of the test works on spodumene mineral concentrate sample from the project in April 2021. Construction began in 2021 and full operational mining commenced in October 2022, with initial export shipments expected in early 2023.  Tesla, Inc. has contracted for 110,000 tonnes of spodumene concentrate over four years from the Finniss lithium mine.

Lithium production 

Orocobre's Olaroz Lithium Facility increased production in FY2018 by 5 percent to 12,740 tonnes. Olaroz produces lithium carbonate at an average operating cost of US$4,194/tonne in FY2018. "Throughout FY18 Orocobre and TTC progressed plans for a 10,000 tonnes per annum Lithium Hydroxide Plant to be built in Naraha, Japan".

Galaxy Resources Mt Cattlin operation in Ravensthorpe produced 156,689 tonnes of lithium concentrate in 2018. Galaxy Resources has acquired new mine tenements which it seeks to actively explore in 2019. Galaxy resources James Bay project contains approximately 40.3Mt at 1.4 percent lithium oxide. The site is currently in "pre-work engineering by Hydro-Quebec involving the design and construction of a powerline and connection infrastructure for future power supply to the project".  

Pilbara minerals commenced construction of its Pilgangoora project in January 2017 which was completed in late July 2018, producing its first lithium concentrate one month later. Pilbara Minerals delivered 111,199 dry metrics tonnes (dmt) to date for 2019 financial year with forecasted production for its March quarter between 47 and 52 thousand dmt. On 28 March Pilbara announced it will commence a partnering process to support its expansion of the Pilgangoora project.

According to Mineral Resources 2019 half year report, 186 000 wet metric tonnes of spodumene concentrate was delivered. Mineral Resources has affirmed it expects to meet production of 450 000 dry metric tonnes per annum. Specifically, year to date March 2019, Mt Marion production delivered 297kwmt at an average cost of A$596.8/wmt. Wodgina mine is currently not producing, however plant commissioning has commenced. Annual production from its Mt Marion and Wodgina mine is 450kt at 6 percent lithium oxide and 750kt at 6 percent lithium oxide respectively. Project life for each mine is over 20 years and 30 years.

Altura Mining has a global resource 50.5 million tonnes, "capable of supporting a mine life over 25 years". The company declared commercial production in March 2019. Annual production is at 220ktpa of 6 percent spodumene concentrate. Altura estimates the cost per tonne to be approximately $430 per tonne. Altura delivered 4 shipments in the December quarter totalling 24kdmt and expects that this can be sustained at 3 shipments per month. In its presentation to the Lithium and Battery Metals Conference, Altura stated "Shipments have exceeded customer expectations with grades as high as 6.3 percent."

Statistics 
Mining in Australia by mineral
Lithium mining
In 2013, Australia produced 12,700 metric tonnes of lithium. In 2018, production reached 51,000Mt, providing an average year on year growth of approximately 32.05 percent.

In 2013, Chile produced 11,200Mt of lithium. In 2018, production reached 16,000Mt, providing an average year on year growth of approximately 7.4 percent.

In 2013, China produced 4,700Mt of lithium. In 2018, production reached 8,000Mt, providing an average year on year growth of approximately 11.22 percent.

Worldwide production increased by 74 percent from 2016 to 2017, predominantly due to a "threefold increase in Australia's spodumene production".

According to the United States Geological Survey, "five spodumene operations in Australia and two brine operations each in Argentina and Chile accounted for the majority of world lithium production". "The leading spodumene operation in Australia increased its spodumene concentrate production by about 40 percent in 2018 and remained the world's largest lithium producer".

Investment in Australian lithium mining companies 

Lithium, being a commodity, means it must be mined or produced from lithium brines. The difference between hard-rock mining and brines is evident in the capital outlay required between the two projects. The capital outlay for hard-rock spodumene exceeds that of lithium brines. This plays a role when identifying whether a project is worth an investment or conversely, if it should be abandoned.

Market demand is another major factor. The rapid growth and expansion of the electric vehicle sector has caused a surge in demand for lithium to support the manufacturing of lithium-ion batteries. The surge in demand translates to higher revenues for existing and new market entrants, reported by the Sydney Morning Herald "Pilbara Minerals managing director and chief executive Ken Brinsden said the demand for higher quality battery materials put WA in the drivers seat"
The rising demand in the market for lithium "shows no signs of slowing" in Australia, which hosts the "highest economic concentrations of lithium via several hard rock deposits". However, as reported by the Australian Financial Review, as supply of lithium grows, the value of existing companies falls. Supply continues to grow as a royal settlement struck by Chilean producer SQM gives the company permission over the next 7 years to more than triple its production, also reported in the Sydney Morning Herald, "but federal forecasts in the resources and energy quarterly found while WA will be pulling out a record 419,000 tonnes of lithium ore spodumene from the ground, it won’t reap the same high prices the industry has experienced."

References